McComas Institute is a historic school located at Joppa, Harford County, Maryland, United States. The school was built in 1867, and is a one-story frame structure with a gable roof, five bays long and three bays wide, and resting on a stone foundation.  It is one of three schools erected in the area by the Freedmen's Bureau after the Civil War.

The McComas Institute was listed on the National Register of Historic Places in 1980.

References

External links

, including photo from 1979, at Maryland Historical Trust

Defunct schools in Maryland
Buildings and structures in Harford County, Maryland
School buildings on the National Register of Historic Places in Maryland
School buildings completed in 1867
African-American historic places
National Register of Historic Places in Harford County, Maryland
Schools supported by the Freedmen's Bureau